Idalus nigropunctata is a moth of the family Erebidae. It was described by Walter Rothschild in 1909. It is found in French Guiana, Venezuela and Amazonas, Brazil.

References

 

nigropunctata
Moths described in 1909